Roy Pierpoint (15 May 1929 – 12 January 2023) was a British racing driver who drove in saloons and sports cars.

Racing career
His first race was in 1949, at a BARC meeting driving a Fiat 1100 special, which he built himself: "very neat was Pierpont's (sic) F.I.A.T. 1,100 with aerodynamic but not all-enveloping bodywork, two Amal carburetters, a neat silencer in its straight exhaust pipe and an oil-cooler ahead of the main radiator." He finished seventh in a 3-lap handicap.

Pierpoint raced very little after that until 1961. In 1962 he drove in several events including the BRDC Trophy at Silverstone, the Guards Trophy and the Brands Six Hour Race where he finished third in his class alongside Bruce Halford. Also that year, he achieved some success at Hill Climb events. He continued in sports car racing in 1963 and 1964, again in the Guards Trophy. In 1968 he was in the Nürburgring 1000 km race in a Ford GT40, but did not finish. He competed in 1968 and 1969 at Denmark's Jyllands-Ringen, with two wins from four races.

Pierpoint was best known for his time driving in the British Saloon Car Championship, with a total of fourteen race wins. In his first year in 1965, he won the Championship for Alan Mann Racing, driving a V8 4.7-litre Ford Mustang: "After a struggle throughout 1965 against the Austin Mini-Cooper S of Warwick Banks,.." The championship was won after a protest against the car of Jack Brabham, which was found to have illegal modifications. He raced a Ford Falcon the following year, which was not competitive enough to defend his title. He stuck with the Falcon for another three years. In 1968 he finished fifth on points and in 1969 he finished third in the championship. He spent two more years in the BSCC, but did not come close to winning the title in a Chevrolet Camaro.

Racing record

Complete British Saloon Car Championship results
(key) (Races in bold indicate pole position; races in italics indicate fastest lap.)

† Events with 2 races staged for the different classes.

References

External links
 BTCC.net official profile
 Historic Racing profile

1929 births
2023 deaths
People from Weybridge
British Touring Car Championship drivers
British Touring Car Championship Champions
English racing drivers
12 Hours of Reims drivers